Mountains of Manhattan is a 1927 American silent drama film directed by James P. Hogan and starring Dorothy Devore, Charles Delaney and Kate Price.

Cast
 Dorothy Devore as Marion Wright 
 Charles Delaney as Jerry Nolan 
 Kate Price as 'Ma' Nolan 
 Robert Gordon as Isadore Ginsberg 
 George Chesebro as Hoyt Norcross 
 James P. Hogan as 'Bull' Kerry 
 Clarence Wilson as Jim Tully 
 Robert Homans as 'Big Bill' Wright

References

Bibliography
 Munden, Kenneth White. The American Film Institute Catalog of Motion Pictures Produced in the United States, Part 1. University of California Press, 1997.

External links
 

1927 films
1927 drama films
1920s English-language films
American silent feature films
Silent American drama films
Films directed by James Patrick Hogan
American black-and-white films
Gotham Pictures films
1920s American films